Santa Cruz de Lorica is a town and municipality located in the Córdoba Department, northern Colombia.

Lorica was named a Pueblo Patrimonio (heritage town) of Colombia in 2010. It is the only municipality near the Caribbean coast that was selected to be part of the Red Turística de Pueblos Patrimonio original cohort.

References
 Gobernacion de Cordoba - Santa Cruz de Lorica
 Santa Cruz de Lorica official website

Municipalities of Córdoba Department